Altoona is a city in Wilson County, Kansas, United States, along the Verdigris River.  As of the 2020 census, the population of the city was 354.

History
Altoona was originally called Geddesburg when it was founded in 1869. It was renamed Altoona in 1870, after Altoona, Pennsylvania. The first post office in Altoona was established in April 1870.

Altoona experienced growth when the railroad was built through the settlement about 1885.

As of 1916, Altoona was a sundown town, where African Americans were not allowed to live.

Geography 
Altoona is located at  (37.526796, -95.661903).

Demographics

2010 census
As of the census of 2010, there were 414 people, 165 households, and 111 families residing in the city. The racial makeup of the city was 95.2% White, 1.2% Native American, and 3.6% from two or more races. Hispanic or Latino of any race were 2.9% of the population.

There were 165 households, of which 32.7% had children under the age of 18 living with them, 44.8% were married couples living together, 16.4% had a female householder with no husband present, 6.1% had a male householder with no wife present, and 32.7% were non-families. 27.9% of all households were made up of individuals, and 9.7% had someone living alone who was 65 years of age or older. The average household size was 2.51 and the average family size was 2.98.

The median age in the city was 37.6 years. 27.5% of residents were under the age of 18; 6.4% were between the ages of 18 and 24; 23.9% were from 25 to 44; 27% were from 45 to 64; and 15.2% were 65 years of age or older. The gender makeup of the city was 47.3% male and 52.7% female.

2000 census
As of the census of 2000, there were 485 people, 201 households, and 133 families residing in the city. The racial makeup of the city was 97.73% White, 1.24% Native American, 0.21% from other races, and 0.82% from two or more races. Hispanic or Latino of any race were 0.41% of the population.

There were 201 households, out of which 31.8% had children under the age of 18 living with them, 47.8% were married couples living together, 13.4% had a female householder with no husband present, and 33.8% were non-families. 32.8% of all households were made up of individuals, and 18.4% had someone living alone who was 65 years of age or older. The average household size was 2.41 and the average family size was 2.99.

In the city, the population was spread out, with 29.5% under the age of 18, 6.4% from 18 to 24, 24.3% from 25 to 44, 23.1% from 45 to 64, and 16.7% who were 65 years of age or older. The median age was 38 years. For every 100 females, there were 90.2 males. For every 100 females age 18 and over, there were 86.9 males.

The median income for a household in the city was $23,906, and the median income for a family was $30,375. Males had a median income of $28,523 versus $22,500 for females. The per capita income for the city was $12,534. About 9.9% of families and 16.3% of the population were below the poverty line, including 21.2% of those under age 18 and 10.1% of those age 65 or over.

Notable people 
 Tom Hamilton, baseball player
 Oren Long, former governor and senator from Hawaii
 Ida Moore, actress
 Benjamin Woodson,  insurance executive

References

Further reading

External links
 Altoona - Directory of Public Officials
 USD 387, local school district
 Altoona city map, KDOT

Cities in Kansas
Cities in Wilson County, Kansas
Sundown towns in Kansas
1869 establishments in Kansas
Populated places established in 1869